Beijing Foreign Studies University (BFSU), is a public university in Beijing, China. BFSU boasts the oldest language programs in China offering the largest number of foreign language majors on different educational levels. Located in Haidian District of Beijing BFSU is divided into east and west campuses. BFSU offers the widest range of language studies in China: as of September 2019, there are 101 foreign languages being taught in this university.  It is a Chinese state Double First Class University identified by Chinese Ministry of Education. BFSU is commonly known as Beiwai in Mandarin. Beijing Foreign Studies University is a sister school to Peking University (PKU) which is also subordinate to the Ministry of Education. For this reason BFSU students are able to register for courses at PKU.

BFSU alumni are well known in Chinese diplomacy circles such as the Ministry of Foreign Affairs and Ministry of State Security. Around 400 ambassadors and over 1,000 counselors graduated from BFSU.  BFSU is thus known as the “Cradle of Diplomats”.

As of 2021, Beijing Foreign Studies University ranked No. 1 in China for universities specializing in language and research in latest edition of the Best Chinese Universities Ranking. The university consistently features in the top 100 international universities in linguistics as ranked by the QS World University Rankings.

History 
BFSU was affiliated with the Ministry of Foreign Affairs from its establishment in 1941 to the early 1980s and was classified a national key university under the Ministry of Education. BFSU qualified for the first round of the competition in its efforts to enter Project 211, a university development plan launched by the Ministry of Education in 1996. BFSU is directly under the leadership of the Chinese Ministry of Education. BFSU is one of China's top universities listed under "Double First Class University Plan", former “Project 211” and "Project 985 Innovative Platforms for Key Disciplines".

BFSU has more than 3,000 international students from all over the world, more than 100 countries. Especially, South Korean, German, Malaysian (IBS) and Japanese students (School of Chinese Language and Literature) are the largest ethnic groups on campus. Some foreign students study only in Mandarin with Chinese students but most of the foreign students select international business school undergraduate program which is taught in English and can take Chinese language courses. More than 70 years, over 90,000 people have graduated from the Beijing Foreign Studies University.

Teaching institutions 

 International Business School (IBS)
 School of International Relations and Diplomacy (SIRD)
 School of English and International Studies (SEIS)
 School of Law (BFSULAW)
 School of English for Specific Purposes (SESP)
 School of European Languages and Cultures (SELC)
 School of International Journalism and Communication (SIJC)
 School of Asian Studies
 School of African Studies
 School of Arabic Studies
 School of Russian
 School of Marxism
 School of Chinese Language and Literature
 School of Art and Research
 Graduate School for Translation and Interpreting
 School of French
 School of German
 School of Spanish and Portuguese
 School of Japanese
 School of Computer Science
 School of Physical Education
 School of Information Science and Technology
 School of History

Rankings and reputation 

BFSU is a research university specializing in foreign language studies. BFSU ranked 17th out of almost 3,000 higher education institutions in China according to statistics based on National College Entrance Examination (Gaokao) from 2012 to 2020.

As of 2021 Beijing Foreign Studies University ranked no.1 among universities in China specializing in language studies and research in the recent edition of the Best Chinese Universities Ranking. The university consistently features in the top 100 international universities in linguistics as ranked by the QS World University Rankings by subjects. BFSU is also highly ranked by the world universities rankings in "Arts and Humanities", "Modern Languages", " English Language and Literature" and "Education".

Notable people
Gao Xingjian, Chinese French novelist who was awarded the Nobel Prize for Literature "For an Oeuvre of Universal Validity, Bitter Insights and Linguistic Ingenuity." Graduated from the Department of French.
Jin Liqun, President of  Asian Infrastructure Investment Bank (AIIB) and Former Vice President of Asian Development Bank (ADB)
Thae Yong-ho, Member of the National Assembly (South Korea). North Korean-born South Korean politician, and former DPRK's deputy ambassador to the United Kingdom. The first North Korean defector to win a National Assembly (South Korea).
 Cui Tiankai, Chinese diplomat and longest-serving Chinese Ambassador to the United States.
 Yang Lan, co-founder and chairperson of the Sun Media Group and the Sun Culture Foundation. Forbes magazine's 100 World's Most Powerful Women.
 He Jiong, ranked 53rd on Forbes China Celebrity 100 list.
 Hao Ping, present president of Peking University, former president of Beijing Foreign Studies University.
 Hu Xijin, former editor-in-chief of Global Times

References

External links
 

 
Universities and colleges in Haidian District
Language education in China
Project 211
Educational institutions established in 1941
1941 establishments in China